The John F. Kennedy Boulevard Bridge was built in 1959 and reconstructed 2009 by the Pennsylvania Department of Transportation. It carries three lanes (two lanes westbound, one lane eastbound) of John F. Kennedy Boulevard (Pennsylvania Route 3 westbound, known as Pennsylvania Boulevard until 1963) across the Schuylkill River, Schuylkill River Trail, and CSX Transportation tracks. The overpass continues east, passing over 23rd, 22nd, and 21st streets to terminate at 20th Street. The bridge runs parallel to the SEPTA Regional Rail's Main Line tracks.

See also
List of crossings of the Schuylkill River
List of memorials to John F. Kennedy

References

Kennedy
Bridges over the Schuylkill River
Bridges completed in 1959
Road bridges in Pennsylvania
University City, Philadelphia
Steel bridges in the United States
Monuments and memorials to John F. Kennedy in the United States